Oxycnemis advena is a moth of the family Noctuidae first described by Augustus Radcliffe Grote in 1882. It is found in southwestern North America in the mountains of southern Arizona, eastern Nevada, southern California and southern Baja California.

The wingspan is about 23 mm. Adults are on wing from July to August.

References

Poole, Robert W. "Oxycnemis advena Grote 1882". nearctica.com. Retrieved January 4, 2021. 

Cuculliinae
Moths described in 1882